German submarine U-472 was a Type VIIC U-boat of Nazi Germany's Kriegsmarine during World War II.

She carried out one patrol. She sank no ships.

She was sunk by a British aircraft Swordfish "B" of 816 Squadron FAA by rocket projectiles, and a British warship, southeast of Bear Island on 4 March 1944.

Design
German Type VIIC submarines were preceded by the shorter Type VIIB submarines. U-472 had a displacement of  when at the surface and  while submerged. She had two shafts and two  propellers.

U-472 was fitted with five  torpedo tubes (four fitted at the bow and one at the stern), fourteen torpedoes, one  SK C/35 naval gun, 220 rounds, and one twin  C/30 anti-aircraft gun. The boat had a complement of between forty-four and sixty.

Service history
The submarine was laid down on 15 November 1941 at the Deutsche Werke in Kiel as yard number 303, launched on 6 March 1943 and commissioned on 26 May under the command of Oberleutnant zur See Wolfgang-Friedrich Freiherr von Forstner.

She served with the 5th U-boat Flotilla from 26 May 1943 for training and the 11th flotilla from 1 January 1944 for operations.

Patrol and loss
U-472s only patrol was preceded by short voyages from Kiel in Germany to Hammerfest then Narvik in Norway. Her only sortie began with her departure from Narvik on 24 February 1944. She sailed out into the Norwegian Sea, then northeast towards the Barents Sea. On 4 March, when southeast of Bear Island, she was attacked and sunk (one source says she might have been scuttled) by gunfire and rockets from a Fairey Swordfish of 816 Naval Air Squadron FAA and the destroyer .

Twenty-three men died with U-472; there were thirty survivors.

Wolfpacks
U-472 took part in four wolfpacks, namely:
 Isegrim (25 – 27 January 1944)
 Werwolf (27 January – 1 February 1944)
 Hartmut (24 – 28 February 1944)
 Boreas (28 February – 4 March 1944)

References

Bibliography

External links

German Type VIIC submarines
U-boats commissioned in 1943
U-boats sunk in 1944
U-boats sunk by British aircraft
U-boats sunk by British warships
1942 ships
Ships built in Kiel
World War II submarines of Germany
World War II shipwrecks in the Arctic Ocean
Maritime incidents in March 1944